The Defector: Escape from North Korea  is a 2012 documentary film about North Korean defectors, directed by Korean-Canadian filmmaker Ann Shin. The film premiered at the Hot Docs Canadian International Documentary Festival and had its broadcast premiere on TVOntario on June 26. The film's release was accompanied by The Defector Interactive, an interactive documentary that uses a videogame-like approach to let the user find out about life in and escape from North Korea. That the film opened at International Documentary Film Festival (IDFA) of Amsterdam, and went on to play at numerous of festivals, winning three Canadian Screen Awards: Best Documentary, Best Documentary Director and the Diversity Award.

References

External links

"Escape From North Korea", an "Op-Doc" by Ann Shin for The New York Times, June 5, 2013
"Why I Needed to Make This Doc", a blog post by Ann Shin for TVOntario, November 22, 2012

2012 films
2012 documentary films
Canadian documentary films
Documentary films about North Korea
Documentary films about refugees
Web documentaries
Films about North Korean defectors
2010s Canadian films